Tus was an ancient city in Razavi Khorasan Province in Iran near Mashhad. To the ancient Greeks, it was known as Susia. It was also known as Tusa. Tus was divided into four cities, Tabran, Radakan, Noan and Teroid. The whole area which today is only called Tus was the largest city in the whole area in the fifth century.

History
According to legend Tous son of Nowzar founded the city of Tous in the province of Khorassan next to today's city of Mashhad. It is said that the city of Tous was the capital of Parthia and the residence of King Vishtaspa, who was the first convert to Zoroastianism. It was captured by Alexander the Great in 330 BCE.

Tus was taken by the Umayyad caliph Abd al-Malik and remained under Umayyad control until 747, when a subordinate of Abu Muslim Khorasani defeated the Umayyad governor during the Abbasid Revolution. In 809, the Abbasid Caliph Harun al-Rashid fell ill and died in Tus, on his way to solve the unrest in Khorasan. His grave is located in the region.

In 1220, Tus was sacked by the Mongol general, Subutai, and a year later Tolui would kill most of its populace, and destroying the tomb of Caliph Harun al-Rashid in the process. Decades later, Tus would be rebuilt under the governorship of Kuerguez.

The most famous person who has emerged from that area is the poet Ferdowsi, author of the Persian epic Shahnameh, whose mausoleum, built in 1934 in time for the millennium of his birth, dominates the town. Other notable residents of Tus include the theologian, jurist, philosopher and mystic al-Ghazali; early polymath Jābir ibn Hayyān; the poet Asadi Tusi; the powerful Seljuk vizier Nizam al-Mulk; the medieval polymath Nasir al-Din al-Tusi; the prominent Usooli mujtahid (Twelver-Shi'a law interpreter) Shaykh Tusi; and the noted Sufi mystic and historian Abu Nasr as-Sarraj.

Registration of Ferdowsi's Tomb in UNESCO 
Ferdowsi Tomb has been nationally registered in the Iranian Cultural Heritage and Tourism Organization and at the suggestion of the Cultural Heritage Organization and Ferdowsi Foundation, efforts have been made to pursue the registration of Ferdowsi Tomb in the UNESCO World Heritage List.

See also

Al-Tusi – a descriptor used for individuals associated with Tus
Tus citadel

References

Sources

External links
 
 Livius.org: Susia (Tus)

Populated places in Mashhad County
Ancient Iranian cities
Populated places along the Silk Road
Nishapur Quarter